Amir (also Romanized as Amīr; also known as Amīrābād and Amīr Qeshlaq) is a village in Qareh Naz Rural District, in the Central District of Maragheh County, East Azerbaijan Province, Iran. At the 2006 census, its population was 230, in 60 families.

References 

Towns and villages in Maragheh County